BPRD may mean:

 Bureau of Police Research and Development, the premier Indian police modernising agency of India
 Bureau for Paranormal Research and Defense, a fictional organization in the comic book work of Mike Mignola